Olney Central College is a public community college in Olney, Illinois. It confers associate degrees and technical certificates and also offers online bachelor's degrees through its affiliation with Franklin University. Olney Central College is a member of the Illinois Eastern Community Colleges district.

Notable alumni
 Clint Barmes, professional baseball player
 Jerad Eickhoff, professional baseball player

External links
 Official website
 Olney Central College men's athletics
 Olney Central College women's athletics

References

Community colleges in Illinois
Education in Richland County, Illinois
Buildings and structures in Richland County, Illinois
NJCAA athletics
1963 establishments in Illinois